= Chao Xuede =

Chinese trade unionist and politician

Chao Xuede (June 1955 - , Chinese: 晁学德), native of Ledu, Qinghai, is a trade unionist and politician in the People's Republic of China.

== Biography ==
As of November 2016, he was the chairman of the State General Confederation of Trade Unions in Qinghai Province, Secretary of the State Workers, Youth, and Women's Chinese Communist Party (CCP) Group, and member of the Standing Committee of the CCP Yushu Tibetan Autonomous Prefecture Committee. He was the deputy director of the Department of Human Resources and Social Security of Qinghai Province from July 2020 to February 2022.
